Sayyet Askan Ashayir Milad (also Romanized as Sāyyet Askān ʿAshāyīr Mīlād) is a village in Zangebar Rural District, in the Central District of Poldasht County, West Azerbaijan Province, Iran. At the 2006 census, its population was 617, in 148 families.

References 

Populated places in Poldasht County